The Annual Review of Microbiology is a peer-reviewed academic journal that publishes review articles about microbiology. It was first published in 1947 as the third journal title released by Annual Reviews. It covers significant developments in the field of microbiology, including the study of bacteria, archaea, viruses, and unicellular eukaryotes. As of 2020, it has had four editors, with Charles E. Clifton and L. Nicholas Ornston serving more than twenty years each.  The current editor is Susan Gottesman.

History
The Annual Review of Microbiology was first published in 1947, the third journal title released by the publishing company Annual Reviews, following titles in biochemistry and physiology. Its first editor was Charles E. Clifton. From 1956 to 1958,  Pierre Grabar provided a summary of the microbiologic literature appearing in the Russian language through a partnership with the National Science Foundation. This was no longer necessary as abstracts became increasingly common, as well as translations from Russian to English. From 1986 onward, the journal placed more of an emphasis on parasites. As of 2020, it was published both in print and electronically.

It defines its scope as microbiology, including bacteria, archaea, viruses, and unicellular eukaryotes. As of 2022, Journal Citation Reports lists the journal's 2021 impact factor as  16.232, ranking it tenth of 136 journal titles in the category "Microbiology".

Editorial processes
The Annual Review of Microbiology is helmed by the editor. The editor is assisted by the editorial committee, which includes associate editors, regular members, and occasionally guest editors. Guest members participate at the invitation of the editor, and serve terms of one year. All other members of the editorial committee are appointed by the Annual Reviews board of directors and serve five-year terms. The editorial committee determines which topics should be included in each volume and solicits reviews from qualified authors. Unsolicited manuscripts are not accepted. Peer review of accepted manuscripts is undertaken by the editorial committee.

Editors of volumes
Dates indicate publication years in which someone was credited as a lead editor or co-editor of a journal volume. The planning process for a volume begins well before the volume appears, so appointment to the position of lead editor generally occurred prior to the first year shown here. An editor who has retired or died may be credited as a lead editor of a volume that they helped to plan, even if it is published after their retirement or death. 

 Charles E. Clifton (1947–1972) 
 Mortimer P. Starr (1973–1982)
 L. Nicholas Ornston (1983–2007)
 Susan Gottesman (2008–present)

Current editorial committee
As of 2022, the editorial committee consists of the editor and the following members:

 Andrew L. Goodman
 Caroline S. Harwood
 Jeff F. Miller 
 L. David Sibley
 Lotte Søgaard-Andersen
 Jason E. Stajich
 Lianhui Zhang

References

 

Microbiology
English-language journals
Annual journals
Publications established in 1947
Microbiology journals